Milton Ross (December 2, 1876 – September 6, 1941) was an American film actor. He appeared in more than 60 films between 1914 and 1948.

Selected filmography

 The Green Swamp (1916)
 The Gunfighter (1917)
 The Desert Man (1917)
 Truthful Tulliver (1917)
 Idolators (1917)
 Time Locks and Diamonds (1917)
 Flare-Up Sal (1918)
 The Tiger Man (1918)
 Riddle Gawne (1918)
 The False Faces (1919)
 The End of the Game (1919)
 The Exquisite Thief (1919)
 Flame of the Desert (1919)
 Duds (1920)
 The Woman and the Puppet (1920)
 The Penalty (1920)
 Voices of the City (1921)
 The Killer (1921)
 Boys Will Be Boys (1921)
 Fortune's Mask (1922)
 The Girl from Rocky Point (1922)
 The Boss of Camp 4 (1922)
 Back Fire (1922)
 Gay and Devilish (1922)
 Salomy Jane (1923)
 The Virginian (1923)
 The Cowboy and the Flapper (1924)
 The Dixie Handicap (1924)
 Breed of the Border (1924)
 The White Desert (1925)
 Heads Up (1925)
 Beyond the Rockies (1926)

References

External links

1876 births
1941 deaths
American male film actors
Male actors from California
20th-century American male actors